Congregation Mishkan Israel, in Hamden, Connecticut, is the oldest Jewish congregation in Connecticut, the 14th oldest continuous operating synagogue in America as well as the oldest continuing synagogue in New England.

It was founded by 15 to 20 New Haven Jewish families, mostly from Bavaria, in 1840, when Jews were not allowed to form their own religious societies.  These families took turns hosting services and event at their homes until the Connecticut Legislature, in 1843, enabled Jews to officially establish synagogues by allowing non-Christian organizations to incorporate in the state.

Mishkan Israel’s first gatherings were held in a room above the Heller-Mendelbaum store at the corner of Grand and State Street in New Haven, Connecticut.

This did not sit well with the New Haven Register, which reported on May 26, 1843: “Whilst we have been busy converting the Jews in other lands, they have outflanked us here, and effected a footing in the very centre of our own fortress.”

It became a Reform synagogue as early as 1856. Also in 1856 the congregation purchased the former Third Congregation Church, a Greek revival building on Court Street between State and Orange Street.
The 1897 building, 55 Audubon Street on the corner of Orange Street in New Haven is now used as a performing arts space for ACES Educational Center for the Arts, a performing arts high school.  It is a contributing building in the Orange Street Historic District. The architects were Arnold W. Brunner and Thomas Tryon. The congregation moved to Ridge Road in Hamden in 1960.  The Ridge Road campus was listed on the National Register in 2021.

Mishkan Israel became a bastion of liberal religious thought and social activism in the 1950s and 1960s.  Then Rabbi Robert E. Goldburg was an outspoken advocate for civil rights, and was arrested in a freedom march along with Martin Luther King and other clergy in 1964.  Earlier, Dr. King had delivered a sermon at Mishkan Israel in 1961, helping to dedicate the new facility, which had relocated to Hamden.  It is said to have been Dr. King’s only preaching from a pulpit in the greater New Haven area.
Rabbi Goldburg stirred congregants’ passions with his strong and eloquent political voice raised frequently in support of racial justice and opposition to the Vietnam War. Dr. Daniel Ellsberg, Alger Hiss, Stokely Carmichael, and William Sloan Coffin were guest speakers at the behest of Rabbi Goldburg. Marilyn Monroe converted to Judaism at CMI during Rabbi Goldburg's tenure. 

The current rabbi at Mishkan Israel is Brian P. Immerman, who has served Mishkan Israel since 2018. He succeeds Rabbi Herbert N. Brockman, now the Emeritus, who had been the spiritual leader at Mishkan Israel for over 30 years. Rabbi Brockman teaches and engages in community projects, and has been at the forefront of interfaith understanding and justice, not only in New Haven, but also nationally and internationally. The current Cantor is Arthur Giglio, who holds a Master of Sacred Music and Diploma of Hazzan from The Jewish Theological Seminary.
Rabbi Brockman decided that a fitting tribute to Rabbi Goldburg and Martin Luther King’s historic connection to Mishkan Israel would be an annual Martin Luther King Interfaith Service which he inaugurated in 2010.

The late peace activist Bruce M. Cohen served as rabbi of Mishkan Israel prior to founding Interns for Peace.

Cemetery
The Mishkan Israel cemetery was created in 1843.

References

External links
 Synagogue website

German-American culture in Connecticut
German-Jewish culture in the United States
Buildings and structures in Hamden, Connecticut
Synagogues in Connecticut
Reform synagogues in Connecticut
National Register of Historic Places in New Haven County, Connecticut